Berthold Graßmuck (13 January 1917 – 18 October 1942) was a Luftwaffe ace and recipient of the Knight's Cross of the Iron Cross during World War II.  The Knight's Cross of the Iron Cross was awarded to recognise extreme battlefield bravery or successful military leadership.  Berthold Graßmuck was shot down by Soviet flak on 18 October 1942 over Pitomnik Airfield during the Battle of Stalingrad.  During his career he was credited with 65 victories.

Summary of career

Aerial victory claims
According to US historian David T. Zabecki, Graßmuck was credited with 65 aerial victories. Mathews and Foreman, authors of Luftwaffe Aces – Biographies and Victory Claims, researched the German Federal Archives and found records for 64 aerial victory claims. With the exception of one aerial victory claimed over the Royal Air Force, all other aerial victories were claimed on the Eastern Front.

Awards
 Aviator badge 
 Front Flying Clasp of the Luftwaffe
 Iron Cross (1939) 2nd and 1st Class
 Honour Goblet of the Luftwaffe on 6 July 1942 as Oberfeldwebel and pilot
 German Cross in Gold on 13 August 1942 as Oberfeldwebel in the I./Jagdgeschwader 52
 Knight's Cross of the Iron Cross on 19 September 1942 as Oberfeldwebel and pilot in the 2./Jagdgeschwader 52

Notes

References

Citations

Bibliography

External links
TracesOfWar.com

1917 births
1942 deaths
People from Coburg (district)
Luftwaffe pilots
German World War II flying aces
Recipients of the Gold German Cross
Recipients of the Knight's Cross of the Iron Cross
Luftwaffe personnel killed in World War II
People from Saxe-Coburg and Gotha
Military personnel from Bavaria
Aviators killed by being shot down